Carl Douglas McMillon (born October 17, 1966) is an American businessman, and the president and chief executive officer (CEO) of Walmart Inc. He sits on the retailer's board of directors. Having first joined the company as a summer associate in high school, he became the company's fifth CEO in 2014. He previously led the company's Sam's Club division, from 2005 to 2009, and Walmart International, from 2009 to 2013.

Early life
McMillon was born in Memphis, Tennessee, and grew up in Jonesboro, Arkansas, the eldest of three children born to Laura and Morris McMillon, a dentist who served in Vietnam. His parents moved the family to Bentonville, Arkansas, the home of Walmart headquarters, when McMillon was 16. A sports enthusiast, McMillon played point guard on the Bentonville High School            basketball team.

Career
McMillon has worked for Walmart throughout his career. He took on his first role with the company as a teenager in 1984. He later became a buyer, then moved into management roles before becoming CEO in 2014.

Early career
When he was a teenager, McMillon began his first job with Walmart as a summer associate. He worked during the summer unloading trucks in a distribution center. After high school, McMillon attended University of Arkansas, where he graduated with a bachelor's degree in 1989.

The next year, as McMillon studied for a Master of Business Administration (MBA) from University of Tulsa, he called Walmart and told an executive he was interested in training to become a buyer when he completed his studies. Soon thereafter, McMillon rejoined Walmart as an assistant manager at a Tulsa, Oklahoma, store. After completing his MBA in 1991, McMillon moved to Walmart's Bentonville headquarters to join the buyer-training program. Originally in charge of buying fishing tackle, he later took on various roles as a buyer and a merchandiser, dealing in food, clothes, crafts and furnishings. He later worked as a general merchandise manager for Walmart's wholesale store division Sam's Club before taking an executive role at Walmart, overseeing toys, electronics, and sporting goods, among other areas.

Sam's Club (2005–2009)
Walmart promoted McMillon to president and CEO of Sam's Club on August 4, 2005. Under McMillon, the wholesaler emphasized marketing to small business customers. Additionally, McMillon incorporated what The Wall Street Journal called "treasure hunt" items that are limited-selection expensive premium items, such as diamond necklaces and wine vacations, for sale next to cheap bulk goods in an attempt to compete with Costco.

Walmart International (2009–2013)
Walmart officials moved McMillon from his role at Sam's Club to lead Walmart's international division in February 2009, replacing Mike Duke, who was promoted to CEO of Walmart Stores, Inc. Under McMillon, Walmart International focused on improving in existing markets, such as Canada, China, United Kingdom and the Americas. One area of particular importance to McMillon was integrating Walmart's "everyday low prices" model to these international markets.

During McMillon's tenure, Walmart International's sales growth outpaced Walmart US and grew to 29 percent of total sales company-wide. When McMillon first became head of the division, it comprised more than 3,300 stores in 14 countries. When Walmart announced it would move him to head Walmart Stores, Inc. in late 2013, Walmart International operated 6,300 stores in 26 countries.

CEO of Walmart, Inc. (2014–present)

Walmart announced on November 25, 2013, that McMillon would immediately join the company's board of directors, and would replace Mike Duke as Walmart CEO effective on February 1, 2014, becoming the company's fifth chief executive.

McMillon took over the company at a time of slowing growth and increased competition from rivals, such as Costco, Amazon.com, grocery store chains Kroger and Safeway, and discount chains of small stores like Family Dollar and Dollar General. Within his first two years as chief executive, McMillon raised wages for hourly workers in the US, boosted the company's commitment to e-commerce and revamped Walmart's executive team. While increased spending on labor and Walmart's digital offerings lowered short-term profits, McMillon argued that the moves would lead to happier workers and better customer service, as well as a better footing in a changing retail market.

In February 2015, McMillon announced Walmart would invest an additional  in higher associate wages, benefits and training, including raising its lowest wage to  an hour in 2015 and  an hour for 2016. The action affected 40 percent of the company's 1.4million US workers. In January 2016, McMillon announced raises for the majority of its workers, free basic short-term disability for full-time workers and a revised paid time off program.

McMillon made it a long-term goal of Walmart to increase investments in e-commerce, stressing a need to create a "seamless shopping experience". As such he announced in 2015 that Walmart would invest  on its online operations. Another goal is to improve the company's environmental sustainability and eliminate waste across the company. In 2014, Walmart began rolling out an initiative to replace lighting in its stores in the US, UK, Latin America and Asia with LED lights for energy efficiency. At the Davos World Economic Forum in January 2016, McMillon said Walmart would press three of its main goals: supply the company with renewable energy, eliminate waste and promote sustainably packaged goods.

As CEO, McMillon sought to make a "positive difference" in other issues. On March 31, 2015, McMillon issued a statement urging Arkansas Gov. Asa Hutchinson to veto the state's "religious freedom" bill. McMillon said the bill "threatens to undermine the spirit of inclusion present throughout the state of Arkansas and does not reflect the values we proudly uphold".

In June 2015, McMillon said the company would stop selling Confederate flag merchandise following the shooting of nine black churchgoers in Charleston, South Carolina. McMillon altered Walmart's gun sales. He told CNNMoney in an interview that Walmart's selection of firearms should be geared towards hunters and sports shooters. In August 2015, the company ceased sales of military-style semiautomatic weapons.

Forbes named McMillon to its World's Most Powerful People list in 2014, 2015 and 2016 where he ranked No.29, No.32, No.27 respectively. ExecRank ranked McMillon No.4 on its 2015 list of top CEOs for large companies.

In December 2016, McMillon joined a business forum assembled by then president-elect Donald Trump to provide strategic and policy advice on economic issues. In August 2017, McMillon wrote a rebuke of President Trump's response to the violent protests Charlottesville, Virginia in an email to all employees and on the internal company website that is viewable by the public. The statement said the President, "missed a critical opportunity to help bring our country together". A company spokesman said McMillon would continue to serve on a presidential advisory council on economic development.

In September 2019, McMillion announced that the company would no longer sell ammunition used for handguns and military-style weapons. This policy update came as a result of the mass shooting which took place at a Walmart in El Paso, Texas in August 2019. McMillion's actions to create a dialogue and take actions around the issue, set a new precedent for how corporations and their leaders address these matters.

Personal life
McMillon lives with his wife, Shelley, in Bentonville, Arkansas. They have two sons. Doug McMillon is a born-again Christian.

References

External links 

 

1966 births
American retail chief executives
Directors of Walmart
Living people
People from Jonesboro, Arkansas
People from Memphis, Tennessee
Sam M. Walton College of Business alumni
University of Arkansas alumni
University of Tulsa alumni
Walmart people
American chief executives of Fortune 500 companies